Arma Konda or Sitamma Konda, is a mountain peak in the northern part of the Eastern Ghats and located in Godavari River basin. It is located in the Madugula Konda sub-range north of Paderu village in Andhra Pradesh, India.

Highest point in Andhra Pradesh and Eastern Ghats
At , Arma Konda or Seethamma Konda is the highest mountain peak in the state of Andhra Pradesh as well as in the Godavari River basin. It is also the tallest peak of the Eastern Ghats. The peak is named as Sitamma Konda in Survey of India maps.

Arma Konda lies second only to Anamudi in India in terms of its topographic isolation.

See also
Geography of Andhra Pradesh
List of mountains in India
List of mountains by elevation

References

External links
Peakbagger - Arma Konda, India; Elevation: 1680 meters, 5512 feet
Traditional Uses of Some Medicinal Plants by tribals of Gangaraju Madugula Mandal of Visakhapatnam District, Andhra Pradesh

Mountains of Andhra Pradesh
Eastern Ghats
Highest points of Indian states and union territories